Saint Urban may refer to:

 Pope Urban I, 3rd century Pope
 Saint Urban, Washington, an unincorporated community
 Urban of Langres (327- 390), French bishop
 Urban, one of the Martyrs of Zaragoza in 303 CE
 St. Urban Tower a Gothic prismatic campanile with a pyramidal roof in Košice, Slovakia.

See also
 Saint-Urbain (disambiguation)